Artur Liiberg (1884–?) was an Estonian politician. He was a member of I Riigikogu. On 6 December 1921, he resigned his position and he was replaced by Jaan Tiks.

References

1884 births
Year of death missing
Estonian Independent Socialist Workers' Party politicians
Members of the Riigikogu, 1920–1923